The GLAAD Media Award for Outstanding Comic Book is an annual award that honors comic books for excellence in the depiction of LGBT (lesbian, gay, bisexual, and transgender) characters and themes. It is one of several categories of the annual GLAAD Media Awards, which are presented by GLAAD—an American non-governmental media monitoring organization founded in 1985, formerly called the Gay & Lesbian Alliance Against Defamation—at ceremonies in New York City, Los Angeles, and San Francisco between March and June.

The award was introduced in 1992 as a non-competitive category at the 3rd GLAAD Media Awards. The first honoree was the second volume of The Flash, an ongoing comic book series published by DC Comics and written by William Messner-Loebs. No award was given from 1993 through 1995, but one comic has been recognized every year since 1996. Outstanding Comic Book became a competitive category in 1997. While the award initially encompassed all types of comics—such as comic books, comic strips, and graphic novels—GLAAD split the category into two starting with the 33rd ceremony in 2022; Outstanding Comic Book and Outstanding Original Graphic Novel/Anthology.

For a comic to be eligible, it must be targeted at a general audience and be sold nationwide in comic retail stores. Furthermore, it must be published by one of the United States' four mainstream comic book publishers—Dark Horse Comics, DC Comics, Image Comics, or Marvel Comics—or their subsidiaries. A title from another publisher is eligible at GLAAD's discretion if it manages to attain a degree of visibility and impact similar to that of one of the four mainstream publishers.

Comic books selected by GLAAD are evaluated based on four criteria: "Fair, Accurate, and Inclusive Representations" of the LGBT community, "Boldness and Originality" of the project, significant "Impact" on mainstream culture, and "Overall Quality" of the project. GLAAD monitors mainstream media to identify which comic books will be nominated, while also issuing a Call for Entries that encourages media outlets to submit titles for consideration. Comics created by and for an LGBT audience must be submitted in order to be considered for nomination, as GLAAD does not monitor such works for defamation. Winners are determined by a plurality vote by GLAAD staff and board, Shareholders Circle members, as well as volunteers and allies.

Since its inception, the award has been given to 26 comics. Green Lantern, Young Avengers, and Strangers in Paradise are the only titles to have received the award twice, and Green Lantern is the only work to have won in two consecutive years; 2002 and 2003. Judd Winick is the writer with the most wins, having been nominated four times and winning three, including two for Green Lantern. With nine nominations and one win, James Tynion IV  has been nominated more often than any other writer. With four nominations, The Authority is the comic that has been nominated the most often without a win, while with six nominations, Brian K. Vaughan is the most-nominated writer without a win.

Since the mid-2000s the award has received some criticism for its emphasis on mainstream comics—including its exclusion of non-mainstream comics, webcomics, and manga—as well as failing to recognize comic book artists alongside writers in nominations, though artists were eventually honored alonsdige writers as of the 34th GLAAD Media Awards. The current holder of the award is Mariko Tamaki, who won the award for her work on the comic book series Crush and Lobo, published by DC Comics at the 33rd GLAAD Media Awards in 2022.

Winners and nominees

1990s

2000s

2010s

2020s

Multiple wins and nominations

Titles

The following titles received two or more Outstanding Comic Book awards:

The following titles received four or more Outstanding Comic Book nominations:

Writers

The following writers received two or more Outstanding Comic Book awards:

The following writers received four or more Outstanding Comic Book nominations:

Publishers

The following publishers received two or more Outstanding Comic Book awards:

The following publishers received four or more Outstanding Comic Book nominations:

Criticism
Rich Thigpen, a member of the advisory board of Prism Comics, has described a debate existing regarding GLAAD's award for Outstanding Comic Book and whether the comics the organization nominates "were deserving because of their LGBT content or because of the press coverage they generated". Thigpen stated that, given GLAAD's "very mission statement", it is expected that most Outstanding Comic Book nominees will be mainstream works that have "made the biggest media impact", and that he personally sees nothing wrong with this.

Andrew Wheeler of ComicsAlliance has also criticed the focus on mainstream comics, as it results in the award having a "somewhat narrow focus". He points out how, despite Alison Bechdel's Fun Home winning the Outstanding Comic Book award in 2007, Are You My Mother? wasn't even nominated during the 2013 ceremony. Wheeler also criticized the exclusion of webcomics, arguing that the most "progressive and inclusive LGBT content in comics today" is to be found in digital comics. The omission of manga has also been criticized, with Yuricon founder Erica Friedman stating that she has often written to GLAAD about including manga in this category.

The category has also been criticized for recognizing only the writers of individual comics, but not the artists. Wheeler has described this as "frustrating" and argued that it "undermines the award's credibility". Writing for Paste, Steve Foxe described GLAAD's unacknowledgement of artists as "painful". GLAAD's failure to recognize artists was criticized in 2019 by both comics journalist Oliver Sava and frequent Marvel Comics artist Mark Brooks. By 2022, GLAAD continued to not recognize comic book artists in nominations, which Rich Johnston of Bleeding Cool lamented.

Notes

References

Footnotes

Bibliography
 
 
 
 

American literary awards

LGBT characters in comics
Comics awards